Shailaja or Sailaja is an Indian name. In the Sanskrit language, it means Parvati (Shaila = Mountain + ja = Born to). People with this name include:

 Sripathi Panditaradhyula Sailaja, Indian singer
 Shailaja Acharya, former Nepalese politician
 Shailaja Pujari (born 1982), Indian weightlifter
 Shailaja Salokhe, Indian table tennis player

See also
 Mr & Mrs Sailaja Krishnamurthy, a 2004 Telugu-language film